The Middlesex County Cricket League (MCCL) is the only adult Saturday league for recreational club cricket in the historic county of Middlesex, England. In practical terms, this means it encompasses teams from North and West London. The league was founded in 1972, and since 1999 the top division of the Middlesex County Cricket League has been a designated ECB Premier League. 

Four MCCL clubs have won the ECB National Club Cricket Championship: Enfield (1988), Hampstead (1969), Southgate (1977), and Teddington (1989 and 1991). Ealing have won the ECB National Club Twenty20 twice (2011 and 2015).

History
The MCCL was officially founded in 1972, after holding a 'dry run' in 1971 to ensure that the league's launch went smoothly. It was founded with 16 clubs as members (Brentham, Brondesbury, Ealing, Edmonton, Enfield, Finchley, Hornsey, North Middlesex, Richmond, Shepherds Bush, South Hampstead, Southgate, Stanmore, Teddington, Wembley, and Winchmore Hill), and in the first season Hornsey won the league title with ten wins from their fifteen fixtures. As of the 2021 season, 7 of the 10 sides in the Premier Division are one of these founding members.

The format of matches was the same for the formation of the league until 2014, with all matches played on a "timed" basis, with draws possible. From 2015 onwards, the format was changed in the Premier Division such that half the matches were timed, and half played in a limited overs format; in 2016, other divisions followed, with all adopting split formats.

The dominant team in the league has evolved over time, with Finchley dominant in the 1970s and 1990s, while Ealing won an unprecedented seven consecutive titles from 2005 to 2011.

League Structure
The league is played (other than in the lowest divisions) between divisions of ten clubs, each playing the other members of their division twice for an 18 week season, commencing in early May and ending in early September. Divisions are segregated so that a first XI from one club will only play first XIs of other clubs; the same is the case for second XIs, while third, fourth and fifth XIs play in a merged competition. The MCCL has undergone two major mergers in recent years, merging with the 1987 League in 2019, and then subsequently absorbing the Middlesex Championship ahead of the 2021 season. Following those mergers the League consists of six full divisions and a shorthanded seventh division for first XIs; five full divisions and a reduced size fifth division for second XIs; and nine divisions for third, fourth and fifth XIs.

Winners

Middlesex County Cricket League since 1972
 

 

 

Source:

Performance by season from 1999

References

English domestic cricket competitions
ECB Premier Leagues
Cricket in Middlesex